Thabeikkyin District is the district of Mandalay Region, Myanmar. Its principal town is Thabeikkyin.


Townships

The townships, cities, towns that are included in Thabeikkyin District are as follows:
Thabeikkyin Township
Thabeikkyin
Tagaung
Singu Township
Singu
Mogok Township

History
On April 30, 2022, new districts were expanded and organized. Thabeikkyin, Singu and Mogok Townships from Pyinoolwin District were formed as Thabeikkyin District.

References

Districts of Myanmar
Mandalay Region